The Perks of Being a Wallflower is a 2012 American coming-of-age drama film written, directed and based on the 1999 novel of the same name by Stephen Chbosky. Logan Lerman stars as a teenager named Charlie who writes to an unnamed friend, and these epistles chronicle his trials, tribulations, and triumphs as he goes through his freshman year of high school. The film depicts his struggles with his, unbeknownst to him, post-traumatic stress disorder, as he goes through his journey in high school making new friends, portrayed by Emma Watson and Ezra Miller. The film's ensemble cast also includes Mae Whitman, Kate Walsh, Dylan McDermott, Joan Cusack, Nina Dobrev and Paul Rudd in supporting roles.

Chbosky had always intended to adapt the novel to film, but did not rush to do so. He was hesitant to sell the rights to the film to anyone, but eventually sold them to Mr. Mudd Productions as long as they let him write and direct the film. Filming began in Pittsburgh, Pennsylvania, in May 2011 and lasted approximately fifty days.

The Perks of Being a Wallflower had its world premiere at the 2012 Toronto International Film Festival on September 8, 2012, to a standing ovation. It was released theatrically in the United States on September 21, 2012, by Summit Entertainment. The film was well received by critics, who praised Chbosky's screenplay and direction, the performances of Lerman, Watson and Miller, soundtrack, execution of its topics, and emotional weight. It was also a box office success, grossing $33.3 million on a budget of $13 million, and received several accolades, including the Independent Spirit Award for Best First Feature, two Critics' Choice Movie Awards nominations, and the GLAAD Media Award for Outstanding Film – Wide Release. The film has since become a cult classic, especially among Zillennials, and helped define the "Tumblr era" in the early 2010s.

Plot
In 1991, Charlie, who has suffered from clinical depression since childhood, has been discharged from a mental health care institution. Uneasy about beginning his freshman year of high school, he is shy and has difficulty making friends. Charlie does connect with his English teacher, Mr. Anderson.

Charlie meets two seniors, Sam and her maternal stepbrother Patrick, at a football game. After the homecoming dance, Sam and Patrick invite him to a party. He unknowingly eats a weed brownie, gets high and discloses to Sam that the year before, his best friend committed suicide. He also walks in on Patrick and Brad, the high school quarterback, kissing. Patrick tells Charlie that Brad is closeted, so he agrees to keep it a secret.

Sam realizes that Charlie has no other friends, so she and Patrick bring Charlie into their group. On their way home, the three hear an unknown song on the radio. Sam instructs Patrick to drive through a tunnel, so she can stand up in the back of the pickup while the music blasts.

Sam needs to improve her SAT scores to have a better chance of being accepted to Pennsylvania State University, so Charlie offers to tutor her, which improves her scores. At Christmas, she gives him a vintage typewriter to thank him. They discuss relationships, and Charlie reveals he has never been kissed. Sam reveals that her first kiss was at age 11 by her father's boss. He reveals that his Aunt Helen was also sexually assaulted as a child, but claims that she was "able to turn her life around". Sam tells Charlie she wants his first kiss to be from someone who loves him, and kisses him.

At a regular Rocky Horror Picture Show performance, Charlie is asked to fill in for Sam's boyfriend Craig, who is not there. Their friend Mary Elizabeth is impressed and asks him to the Sadie Hawkins dance, and they enter into an unsatisfactory relationship. At a party, when Charlie is dared to kiss the prettiest girl in the room, he chooses Sam, upsetting both her and Mary Elizabeth. Patrick tells Charlie to stay away from the group for a while; the isolation causes him to sink back into depression. He experiences flashbacks of his Aunt Helen, who died in a car accident on his seventh birthday.

Brad shows up to school with bruises on his face after being caught by his father having sex with Patrick. Brad claims he was jumped and beaten up, and distances himself from Patrick, calling him a "faggot." In anger, Patrick punches him, causing him to retaliate. Brad's friends begin beating Patrick, preventing Sam from intervening, but Charlie forcefully intervenes, then blacks out. Upon recovering, he finds he has bruised knuckles and Brad's friends are incapacitated. Sam and Patrick express their gratitude to Charlie, and the three become friends again.

Patrick tries to cope with what happened with Brad, and at one point kisses Charlie, but immediately apologizes. Charlie's mental state quickly worsens after the blackout. Sam is accepted into Penn State, and breaks up with Craig on prom night after learning he is cheating on her. The night before she departs, she brings Charlie to her room. They confide in each other and kiss, but when Sam touches Charlie's thigh, he experiences a momentary flashback of his Aunt Helen, which he passes off as nothing, and they continue kissing.

After Sam leaves for college in the morning, Charlie's emotional state deteriorates and his flashbacks worsen. He calls his sister, blaming himself for Helen's death, and admits he may have wanted it to happen. His sister realizes he is in distress and calls the police. Charlie passes out as they burst through the door and comes to in a hospital, where psychiatrist Dr. Burton brings out his repressed memories, revealing that his aunt sexually abused him as a child.

The night Charlie is released from the hospital, he is visited by Sam and Patrick. Sam explains what college life is like, and that she has found "The Tunnel Song" – "Heroes" by David Bowie. The three revisit the tunnel, where Charlie kisses Sam again, and he stands up in the back of the truck. He acknowledges that he feels alive and at that moment – "We are infinite".

Cast

Production

Development

Chbosky incorporated both fictional ideas and personal experiences into the novel. After five years with these elements in mind, he had the idea of writing the novel during a difficult period in his life. He was experiencing an unpleasant breakup of his own, which led him to ask, "Why do good people let themselves get treated so badly?" The author tried to answer the question with the sentence "we accept the love we think we deserve". This quote references the struggle of finding self love, encompassing one's life and hope for the future, and not just romantic love.

The story began when Chbosky was in school, evolving from another book on which he was working. In that book he wrote the sentence, "I guess that's just one of the perks of being a wallflower", which led him to realize "that somewhere in that ... was the kid I was really trying to find." Chbosky began writing the novel in the summer of 1996 while he was in college, and within ten weeks he completed the story. He rewrote it into two more drafts, concluding the published version in the summer of 1998.

Charlie was loosely based on Chbosky himself. Like the novel itself, Chbosky included much of his own memories from the time he lived in Pittsburgh into the film. The other characters were manifestations of people Chbosky had known throughout his life; Chbosky focused on people's struggles and what they are passionate about, attempting to pin down the very nature of each of the characters. The characters of Sam and Patrick were an "amalgamate and celebration" of several people Chbosky has met; Sam was based on girls who confided in him, and Patrick was "all the kids I knew who were gay and finding their way to their own identity."

Shortly after the novel's release, Chbosky began to write a screenplay for it. Chbosky recalled a meeting with his agent saying, "My agent said we would average a call a week, whether it was from producers optioning it or a writer or director wanting to adapt. Even a German film company, I don't know the name of the company, but they wanted to buy it and turn it into a German film, which I would love to have seen, in an alternate universe kind of way. Yeah, there were many offers, but I couldn't let it go. I don't know how to sell something this personal. And especially what the book meant to the fans—I couldn't let it go to anyone else. I owed the fans a movie that was worthy of their love for the book." When he finally did sit down and started on penning the screenplay, he found it more difficult than the book. The novel took him just four months to write, while the script took him a year.

Chbosky would not sell the rights to the film unless the studio also let him adapt and direct the film. John Malkovich's production companyMr. Mudd Productions purchased the rights to the film and let Chbosky himself write the script and direct the film. In January 2011, Summit acquired distribution rights. The following month, Summit sought a buyer for the project at the European Film Market held simultaneously with the Berlin International Film Festival.

Casting
In May 2010, Logan Lerman and Emma Watson were reportedly in talks for the project and confirmed the following year. In April 2011, Mae Whitman signed on as Mary Elizabeth and Nina Dobrev was cast as Candace. Paul Rudd was cast as Mr. Anderson later that month. On May 9, 2011, Kate Walsh announced that she was cast in the film as Charlie's mother and had begun filming. On May 19, 2011, it was announced that Ezra Miller had joined the film.

Filming
The film was shot in the Cincinnati & Pittsburgh Metropolitan Area from May 9 to June 29, 2011. Initial filming began in Pittsburgh's South Hills, including South Park, Upper St. Clair, and Peters Township High School.

The Rocky Horror Picture Show scenes were filmed at The Hollywood Theater in Dormont after Chbosky learned that the theater was re-opening; he had seen The Rocky Horror Picture Show there when he was younger.

The film also has scenes within Pittsburgh city limits inside the Fort Pitt Tunnel, Fort Pitt Bridge on Interstate 376 and on Mount Washington.

Music

The soundtrack to The Perks of Being a Wallflower was released by Atlantic Records on September 11, 2012, a month before the film's release. The film's music was chosen by the film's director Stephen Chbosky and music supervisor Alexandra Patsavas, while the incidental music was scored by Michael Brook. The score album was released September 25, 2012.

Chbosky wrote on the album's liner notes, “I’ve shared them with friends. And they have shared their favourites with me. Some of the songs are popular. Some of them are not known by a whole lot of people. But they are all great in their own way. And since these songs have meant a lot to me, I just wanted you to have them as a soundtrack for whatever you need them to be for your life.”

Release
The Perks of Being a Wallflower had its world premiere at the 2012 Toronto International Film Festival on September 8, 2012, to a standing ovation.

The film was scheduled to be released on September 14, 2012, but it was announced in August 2012 that it would be released a week later, on September 21, 2012, in selected cities. The film continued to expand on September 28, 2012, with a nationwide release on October 5, 2012. The UK premiere was on September 23 at the Cambridge Film Festival.

Rating
The film originally received an R rating for "teen drug and alcohol use, and some sexual references". The filmmakers appealed, and the MPAA changed it to PG-13 for "mature thematic material, drug and alcohol use, sexual content including references, and a fightall involving teens".

Box office
The Perks of Being a Wallflower received a limited release of four theaters in the United States on September 21, 2012, and grossed $228,359 on its limited opening weekend, averaging $57,089 per theater. The film earned $17,742,948 in North America and $15,641,179 in other countries, for a worldwide total of $33,384,127.

Reception
On review aggregator Rotten Tomatoes, the film has an approval rating of 85% based on 172 reviews, with an average rating of 7.50/10. The website's critics consensus reads, "The Perks of Being a Wallflower is a heartfelt and sincere adaptation that's bolstered by strong lead performances." On Metacritic, it has a weighted average score of 67 out of 100, based on 36 critics, indicating "generally favorable reviews". On CinemaScore, audience members gave the film an average grade of "A" on an A+ to F scale.

Roger Ebert of the Chicago Sun-Times gave the film three and a half stars out of four, writing in his review, "All of my previous selves still survive somewhere inside of me, and my previous adolescent would have loved The Perks of Being a Wallflower".

The lead cast also earned positive notice. Ian Buckwalter of The Atlantic said, "The primary trio of actors delivers outstanding performances, starting with Watson, who sheds the memory of a decade playing Hermione in the Harry Potter series with an about-face as a flirtatious but insecure free spirit. Miller also plays against his most recent performance, which was as the tightly wound eponymous teenage psychopath in We Need to Talk About Kevin, to deliver a giddy, scene-stealing turn as Patrick. Lerman, best known f[or] the Percy Jackson series, shines as Charlie, a role that demands he be immediately likeable while still holding onto some deep darkness that can't be fully revealed until the end."

John Anderson of Newsday also praised the cast, saying "As Sam, the quasi-bad girl trying to reinvent herself before college, she (Emma Watson) brings honesty and a lack of cliche to a character who might have been a standard-issue student. But equally fine are her co-stars: Ezra Miller, who plays the gay character Patrick as something messy and unusual; Paul Rudd, as their English teacher, is refreshingly thoughtful. And Charlie is portrayed by Lerman as quietly observant, yearning and delicate in a way that will click with audiences regardless of age".

Some critics had a less favorable response to the film, with the main criticism being that the portrayal of teenage issues is idealized and the casting uninspired. The Miami Herald critic Connie Ogle notes that "the suicide of Charlie's best friend, which takes place before the film opens, seems glossed over too quickly" despite the event being Charlie's main character motivation in the film. Jack Wilson of The Age writes, "the script is transparently fake at almost every moment, congratulating the gang on their non-conformity while soft-pedalling any aspect of adolescent behaviour—drug use, sex, profanity—that might upset the American mainstream." Richard Corliss of Time criticized the casting of actors in their twenties to play teenage characters unlike Heathers (1989), another coming-of-age film in which the lead actors were actual teenagers.

MTV, Us Weekly and Complex named The Perks of Being a Wallflower one of the best films of 2012.

The film also influenced the "Tumblr culture" that was around online when the film was released. With online users posting GIFs, images of the film's cast, and blogs about the film which often took over Internet forums during the early 2010s.

Accolades

References

External links 

 
 
 
 
 

2012 films
2012 independent films
2012 LGBT-related films
2010s coming-of-age drama films
2010s high school films
2012 romantic drama films
2010s teen drama films
2010s teen romance films
American coming-of-age drama films
American high school films
American independent films
American romantic drama films
American teen drama films
American teen LGBT-related films
American teen romance films
Coming-of-age romance films
Films about amnesia
Films about child sexual abuse
Films about depression
Films about drugs
Films about infidelity
Films about proms
Films about psychiatry
Films about suicide
Films based on American novels
Films directed by Stephen Chbosky
Films scored by Michael Brook
Films set in 1991
Films set in 1992
Films set in the 1990s
Films set in Pittsburgh
Films set in psychiatric hospitals
Films shot in Pittsburgh
Films with screenplays by Stephen Chbosky
Gay-related films
Incest in film
LGBT-related coming-of-age films
LGBT-related romantic drama films
Mr. Mudd films
Summit Entertainment films
2010s English-language films
2010s American films